Marcus Verrius Flaccus (c. 55 BCAD 20) was a Roman grammarian and teacher who flourished under Augustus and Tiberius.

Life

He was a freedman, and his manumitter has been identified with Verrius Flaccus, an authority on pontifical law; but for chronological reasons the name of Veranius Flaccus, a writer on augury, has been suggested (Teuffel-Schwabe, Hist. of Roman Lit. 199, 4). He gained such a reputation by his methods of instruction that he was summoned to court to bring up Gaius and Lucius, the grandsons of Augustus. He moved there with his whole school, and his salary was greatly increased on the condition that he took no fresh pupils. He died at an advanced age during the reign of Tiberius (Suetonius, De Grammaticis, 17), and a statue in his honour was erected at Praeneste, in a marble recess, with inscriptions from his Fasti Praenestini.

Works

Flaccus was also a distinguished philologist and antiquarian investigator. His most important work, De verborum significatu, was the first major alphabetical dictionary in Latin. Though only small fragments remain of the work, it served as the basis for Sextus Pompeius Festus's epitome, also called De verborum significatu. Festus's work was in turn abridged centuries later by Paul the Deacon for the library of Charlemagne. Of the calendar of Roman festivals (Fasti Praenestini) engraved on marble and set up in the forum at Praeneste, some fragments were discovered (1771) at some distance from the town itself in a Christian building of later date, and some consular fasti in the forum itself (1778). The collection was subsequently increased by two new fragments.

Other lost works of Flaccus include:
De Orthographia: De Obscuris Catonis, an elucidation of obscurities in the writings of Cato the Elder
Saturnus, dealing with questions of Roman ritual
Rerum memoria dignarum libri, an encyclopaedic work much used by Pliny the Elder
Res Etruscae, probably on augury.

See also
Quintus Caecilius Epirota

References

Attribution:

For the fragments of the Fasti see Corpus Inscriptionum Latinarum, i. pp. 311; 
G. Gatti, "Due nuovi Frammenti del Calendario di Verrio Flacco," in Atti della r. Accademia dei Lincei, 5th ser., vol. 5, pt. 2, p. 421 (1898); 
Winther, De Fastis Verrii Flacci ab Ovidio adhibitis (1885); 
John Edwin Sandys, Classical Scholarship (ed. 1906), vol. i., index, s.v. "Verrius"; 
Fragments of Flaccus in KO Müller's edition of Festus; 
Henry Nettleship, Lectures and Essays.

External links
Fragments of Verrius Flaccus's works and testimonia in Latin
English translation of Fasti Praenestinini at attalus.org

Flaccus, Marcus Verrius
Flaccus, Marcus Verrius
1st-century BC Latin writers
1st-century Latin writers
1st-century BC lexicographers
1st-century lexicographers
Flaccus, Marcus
Flaccus, Marcus Verrius
Ancient Roman antiquarians
1st-century BC educators
Imperial Roman slaves and freedmen